Ibbi-Sin, son of Shu-Sin, was king of Sumer and Akkad and last king of the Ur III dynasty, and reigned c. 2028–2004 BCE (Middle chronology) or possibly c. 1964–1940 BCE (Short chronology). During his reign, the Sumerian empire was attacked repeatedly by Amorites. As faith in Ibbi-Sin's leadership failed, Elam declared its independence and began to raid as well.

Ibbi-Sin ordered fortifications built at the important cities of  Ur and Nippur, but these efforts were not enough to stop the raids or keep the empire unified. Cities throughout Ibbi-Sin's empire fell away from a king who could not protect them, notably Isin under the Amorite ruler Ishbi-Erra. Ibbi-Sin was, by the end of his kingship, left with only the city of Ur. In 2004 or 1940 BCE, the Elamites, along with "tribesmen from the region of Shimashki in the Zagros Mountains" sacked Ur and took Ibbi-Sin captive; he was taken to the city of Elam where he was imprisoned and, at an unknown date, died.

Amorite invasion
The Amorites were considered a backward people by Mesopotamian standards; Ibbi-Sin's 17th year was officially named "Year the Amorites, the powerful south wind who, from the remote past, have not known cities, submitted to Ibbi-Sin the king of Ur." However, despite his father Shu-Sin having built a "wall of Martu" across Mesopotamia against Amorite incursions, these were penetrated early in Ibbi-Sin's reign.

Scholars have suggested that, by the reign of Ibbi-Sin, the empire was already in decline due to long-term drought – in fact, the same drought that helped to take down the Akkadian Empire c. 2193 BCE may have been responsible for the fall of Ur III.

Studies of Persian Gulf sediments indicate that the stream flow of the Tigris and Euphrates was very low around 2100–2000 BCE. [...] Any damage to the agricultural system by enemy raids, bureaucratic mismanagement, or an inattentive ruler would result in food shortages

In years seven and eight of Ibbi-Sin's kingship, the price of grain increased to 60 times the norm, which means that the success of the Amorites in disrupting the Ur III empire is, at least in part, a product of attacks on the agricultural and irrigation systems.

Invasion by Elam
These attacks brought famine and caused an economic collapse in the empire, paving the way for the Elamites under Kindattu to strike into Ur and capture the king. The Lament for Sumer and Ur describe the fall of Ur and the fate of Ibbi-Sin:

Year names
All the year names of Ibbi-Sin are known, documenting the major events of his reign. The main year names are:

Inscriptions

References

|-

Sumerian kings
21st-century BC Sumerian kings
20th-century BC Sumerian kings
Third Dynasty of Ur